SS Glenlea was a merchant ship built by John Priestman & Co in Southwick, Sunderland and was completed in August of 1930. She was owned by John Morrison & Son located in Newcastle-upon-Tyne. She was sunk in 1942 after becoming a straggler in convoy ON 142.

History 
Glenlea was a British steam merchant ship and was one of two of the last ships built by John Priestman & Co., the other ship being the Finland. The ship was finished in August of 1930. The ship eventually came under ownership of John Morrison & Son.

On 7 November 1942, the Glenlea was torpedoed and sunk by  after falling behind from its convoy, ON 142. Out of the 49 crew on board, 44 died.

References 

1930 ships
World War II merchant ships of the United Kingdom

Merchant ships
Battle of the Atlantic